Scott Bradley (born October 14, 1976, in Mountain View, California) is a former American racing driver. Bradley won the 2001 Star Mazda championship. Bradley also competed in USF2000, American Le Mans Series among other series.

Racing career
Scott Bradley began racing go-karts with the IKF in 1990 at the age of fourteen. In 1993 Bradley made his single seater debut. After completing the Skip Barber Racing School he raced in the Skip Barber Racing School Formula Ford before moving into Formula Continental. For 1995 Bradley stepped up to the professional USF2000. He scored a pole position at Watkins Glen International but failed to finish the race. His best race result was an eighth place at Mid-Ohio Sports Car Course. The following, joining DSTP Motorsports, year he improved his best result to seventh, at Richmond International Raceway. In October 1996 Bradley tested a Formula Renault car for Redgrave Racing. Despite impressing several teams he failed to put together a budget for the 1997 season leaving him without a drive.

In 1998 Bradley returned to the racing track running selected SCCA Formula Continental races. In 1999 Bradley ran a partial Formula Dodge Western Race Series schedule. Bradley finished on the podium twice, at Willow Springs Raceway and Las Vegas Motor Speedway. Bradley ran full-time in the Star Mazda series in 2000. Racing with World Speed Motorsports he scored his first podium at Sonoma Raceway. He finished fourth in his inaugural championship. He returned to the series in 2001. Bradley won races at Texas Motor Speedway and Mazda Raceway Laguna Seca. He secured the championship over Marc De Vellis with a two-point advantage.

He continued with Mazda the following years in the SPEED World Challenge Touring Car division. Racing a Mazda Protege he scored one pole position in 2002. In 2005 he raced a Mazda 6 in the class without major results. In the American Le Mans Series Bradley joined Essex Racing. With teammate Jason Workman the team scored two podium finished, at the 2003 Grand Prix Americas and 2003 Monterey Sports Car Championships.

Failing to secure a full-time race seat he ended his professional racing career. In 2005 Bradley joined the Star Race Cars as Sales and Marketing Manager.

Complete motorsports results

American Open-Wheel racing results
(key) (Races in bold indicate pole position, races in italics indicate fastest race lap)

USF2000 National Championship results

Star Mazda Championship

References

1976 births
Racing drivers from California
Racing drivers from San Jose, California
American Le Mans Series drivers
U.S. F2000 National Championship drivers
Formula Ford drivers
Indy Pro 2000 Championship drivers
International Kart Federation drivers
People from Mountain View, California
Living people